Home Team is a 1998 comedy film starring Steve Guttenberg.

Plot summary
Mr. Butler is a former pro soccer player whose reputation for partying and gambling has caught up with him. He is sentenced to a year of probation, which includes working as a handyman in a dilapidated boys' home. Karen runs the home for a group of eleven boys whose parents could not raise them for some reason. Karen wants the boys to do something meaningful so she persuades them to start a soccer team known simply as "Home Team". They are terrible, but Mr. Butler, who has concealed his skills so far, is persuaded to coach the team, which eventually improves. A fire damages the home to the point that it must be torn down, and the boys will be separated, but efforts are made to keep the boys together. In a rematch, Home Team ends up defeating the first team they played on the way to a possible championship. The boys' cook Cookie, who likes to bet on horse races, made a bet with a Las Vegas bookie that Home Team would win; his winnings will be enough to get them a new house.

Cast
 Steve Guttenberg as Henry Butler
 Sophie Lorain as Karen
 Ryan Slater as Julian
 Michel Perron as Cookie
 Carl Alacchi as Larkin
 Johnny Morina as Alex
 Tyler Hynes as Chip
 David Deveau as Pineapple
 Frank Schorpion as Vince
 Richard Jutras as Semary
 Ashton Laine Jersey as Meghan
 Kathleen Fee as Social Service Woman
 Willy Lavendel as Charlie
 Chad Connell as Eric
 Anthony Etesonne-Bedard as Four Eyes
 Eric Lightbourne as Goodbye
 Brian Paul Imperial as Gregory

Production
Home Team was filmed in Montreal, Quebec, Canada.  15-year old Ryan Slater in the film is also the half-brother of actress Christian Slater.

Screenwriter (and attorney) Pierce O'Donnell, who wrote the script in 1994, filed suit against the Canadian producer group in 2000, regarding allegedly unfair accounting practices in the film's development costs.

The French title of the movie is  "Une combinaison gagnante" (A winning combination) and the German name is Home Team – Ein treffsicheres Team (An unerring team).

Reception
The Wallflower critical guide to contemporary North American directors (2000) notes that Home Team was "little known" at that time.  VideoHound's Golden Movie Retriever (2004) writes that the movie has a "familiar plot but that's not necessarily bad."  The Radio Times Guide To Film (2007) opined that "Hollywood still hasn't got the hang of football (or soccer, as they insist on calling it) and this family-oriented frolic is decidedly minor league."

Efilmcritic.com's 2001 review of the film was especially biting, calling it "an affront to film making".

References

External links
 
 

1998 films
1990s sports comedy films
Films directed by Allan A. Goldstein
American association football films
American sports comedy films
1998 comedy films
1990s English-language films
1990s American films